The 1960 United States presidential election in Pennsylvania took place on November 8, 1960 as part of the 1960 United States presidential election. Voters chose 32 representatives, or electors to the Electoral College, who voted for president and vice president.

Pennsylvania had historically been a powerfully Republican state that owing to the industrialization had become Democratic-leaning following the New Deal: 1960 saw Democrats surpass Republicans in registration for the first time since the Civil War. However, the nomination of the second Catholic presidential candidate in John F. Kennedy complicated this issue because most of rural Pennsylvania was powerfully Appalachian and extremely hostile to voting for a Catholic, creating the potential for large anti-Democratic swings and trends in the northeastern non-Yankee Pocono Mountains. The non-Appalachian Pennsylvania Dutch Country had been similarly hostile to Catholicism throughout the state’s history, and owing to the opposition to Irish control of the Democratic Party most of the state’s urban Catholics would before the New Deal back dominant Republican machines in which they had no actual political power.

However, in 1958 Pennsylvania – a state historically very reluctant to elect Catholics to major offices – had elected David L. Lawrence as governor. Nevertheless, his margin was much smaller than polls had previously predicted, with decreases vis-à-vis the 1954 gubernatorial election even in heavily Catholic urban counties. Massachusetts Senator John Fitzgerald Kennedy had emerged as the front-runner for the Democratic nomination but Pennsylvania Democrats were reluctant to run him for fear of an anti-Catholic reaction in traditionally Democratic rural counties. However, lobbying by Boston Archbishop Richard Cushing meant Governor Lawrence released 64 of the state’s 81 delegates for Kennedy in a bid to stop Adlai Stevenson II from gaining a third nomination.

Pennsylvania narrowly voted for the Democratic nominee Senator Kennedy over the Republican nominee, Vice President Richard Nixon. Kennedy won Pennsylvania by a slim margin of 2.32%, being aided rather than hindered by his Catholic faith owing to the numerical power of his co-religionists in urban Philadelphia, Lackawanna County, and in the industrial areas around Lake Erie. This clearly outnumbered anti-Catholic sentiment in rural areas, which caused him to lose ground vis-à-vis Adlai Stevenson in 16 rural counties. Kennedy became the first Democrat ever to win the White House without York County and the second to win without Columbia County and Berks County.

Primaries
Pennsylvania held its primaries on April 26.

Democratic primary
 
With 81 delegates to the 1960 Democratic National Convention, Pennsylvania was among the largest states to hold a primary. Pennsylvania's nonbinding Democratic primary did not list candidate's names. However,  write-in presidential preference votes were allowed. Delegates were elected directly.

By January 1960, the Kennedy campaign became aware of "non-partisan citizen committees" operating in support of Kennedy's candidacy in the state, without any direct connection to his official campaign. However, the state as a whole was still cold on Kennedy. Its liberals were fervent supporters of Adlai Stevenson II, and therefore hoped to see Stevenson nominated for a third time. Philadelphia's Democratic organization, which had a significant sway upon the state's Democratic establishment, was led by William J. Green Jr., who favored the prospective candidacy of Stuart Symington. As the year progressed, Green and other leaders were persuaded by polls to switch their allegiance to Kennedy. Liberal senator Joseph S. Clark Jr. even made it known that Kennedy ranked at least second (behind Stevenson) in his own preference.

However, despite others moving to embrace Kennedy, Governor David L. Lawrence withheld his own support from Kennedy, even as he picked up momentum in the state. Lawrence still reserved hope that Adlai Stevenson could be successfully nominated at the convention. An older Catholic Democrat, Lawrence was public in his belief that the country was still not ready to elect a Catholic president. Kennedy would tell reporters that inquired with him about Lawrence's frequent comments doubting the viability of a Catholic presidential nominee by stating that he was, "deeply disturbed" by them. Referencing Lawrence's own strong victory in the state's 1958 gubernatorial election, Kennedy commented that, "It still behooves him now to be urging that this same opportunity should be denied to others."

Kennedy handily won the primary.

Results

Republican primary

Nixon was the only candidate on the Republican primary ballot and won nearly all of the vote. However, thousands of write-in votes were cast for other individuals.

Results

Results

Results by county

See also
 List of United States presidential elections in Pennsylvania

References

Pennsylvania
1960
1960 Pennsylvania elections